Route nationale 1 (RN 1 or RN1) is the name of a trunk road in many counties:
Route nationale 1 (France) between Paris and Calais.
Route nationale 1 (French Guiana) between Cayenne and Saint-Laurent-du-Maroni
Route nationale 1 (Niger)
Route nationale 1 (Réunion)